Marciana is a town in the province of Livorno, Italy.

Marciana, a feminine and adjectival form of the names Mark or Marcus etc., can also refer to:

People
Ulpia Marciana, sister of the Roman Emperor Trajan, posthumously deified as diva Marciana
Paccia Marciana, first wife of the Roman Emperor Lucius Septimius Severus
Marciana of Mauretania, martyr and saint
 Saint Marciana the Queen, wife of Emperor Justin I (518–527)

Places
Marciana, Cascina, village in the province of Pisa, Italy
Marciana Marina, town in the province of Livorno, Italy
Biblioteca Marciana, historic library and building in Venice
Marciana (Lycia), a town in ancient Lycia